Colombia participated at the 2018 Summer Youth Olympics in Buenos Aires, Argentina from 6 October to 18 October 2018.

Medalists

Medals awarded to participants of mixed-NOCs teams are represented in italics. These medals are not counted towards the individual NOC medal tally.

Archery

Colombia qualified one archer based on its performance at the 2017 World Archery Youth Championships.

Individual

Team

Athletics

Cycling

Colombia qualified a girls' combined team based on its ranking in the Youth Olympic Games Junior Nation Rankings. They also qualified a mixed BMX racing team based on its ranking in the Youth Olympic Games BMX Junior Nation Rankings and two athletes in BMX freestyle based on its performance at the 2018 Urban Cycling World Championship.

 Girls' combined team - 1 team of 2 athletes
 Mixed BMX racing team - 1 team of 2 athletes
 Mixed BMX freestyle - 1 boy and 1 girl

Diving

Gymnastics

Rhythmic
Colombia qualified one gymnast based on its performance at the 2018 American Junior Championship.

 Girls' rhythmic individual all-around - 1 quota

Judo

Individual

Team

Roller speed skating

Colombia qualified two roller skaters based on its performance at the 2018 Roller Speed Skating World Championship.

 Boys' combined speed event - Jhonny Agulo
 Girls' combined speed event - Gabriela Rueda

Rugby sevens

Colombia qualified their national women's team in March 2018.
 Girls' tournament - 1 team of 12 athletes

Girls' tournament

Group stage

Bronze medal match

Shooting

Colombia qualified one sport shooter based on its performance at the American Qualification Tournament.

 Girls' 10m Air Pistol - 1 quota

Individual

Team

Swimming

Taekwondo

Tennis

Singles

Doubles

Triathlon

Colombia qualified two athletes based on its performance at the 2018 American Youth Olympic Games Qualifier.

Individual

Relay

Weightlifting

Colombia qualified three athletes based on its performance at the 2017 World Youth Championships.

Boys

Girls

Wrestling

Key:
  – Victory by Fall
  – Without any point scored by the opponent
  – With point(s) scored by the opponent
  – With point(s) scored by the opponent

See also
 Colombia at the Youth Olympics
 Colombia at the 2019 Pan American Games

References

2018 in Colombian sport
Nations at the 2018 Summer Youth Olympics
Colombia at the Youth Olympics